Hazelwood School District (HSD) is a school district in suburban St. Louis, Missouri and is the second largest district in St. Louis County. The District extends from I-70 on the west and the I-270 bridge on the east, covering 78 square miles, an area larger than the City of St. Louis. Its northern and southern boundaries are the two Great Rivers, the Missouri and the Mississippi, and I-270.

The District covers a large portion of north St. Louis County, Missouri, including all of Black Jack and  Spanish Lake. Additionally it includes portions of:  Bellefontaine Neighbors, Berkeley, Bridgeton, Dellwood, Ferguson, Florissant,  Glasgow Village, Hazelwood, and Old Jamestown.

The district is headquartered in an unincorporated area.

Faculty and staff educate more than 18,000 students in the District's 20 elementary schools, six middle schools and three high schools, plus separate campuses for early childhood, gifted, and individualized learning.

The Hazelwood School District is fully accredited by the Missouri Department of Elementary and Secondary Education.

History

The Hazelwood School district was involved in Hazelwood School District v. Kuhlmeier, a 1988 landmark U.S. Supreme Court case which ruled that public school curricular student newspapers that have not been established as forums for student expression are subject to a lower level of First Amendment protection than independent student expression or newspapers established (by policy or practice) as forums for student expression. The school district was also involved in Hazelwood School District v. United States, a 1977 U.S. Supreme Court case concerning employment discrimination.

In 1977 a history of the Hazelwood School District was published and compiled by Gregory M Franzwa.

In 2016 Hazelwood School District School Board announced a plan to save the district $6.6 million. Included in the plan was staff cuts to the elementary band and orchestra classes, reduced physical education classes for elementary students, and field trip funding will be eliminated. District officials said a 22 percent drop in assessed property values led to the cuts.

In 2022, radioactive materials including lead-210, polonium, and radium, were found at the district's Jana Elementary School. It arose from dumps of munitions during World War II at St. Louis Lambert International Airport, and had flowed from there in Cold Water Creek to the school which lies in its floodplain.
On October 18, it was announced that Jana Elementary School would be temporarily closed, and its classes will switch to online learning until the end of the semester, where the student body will be divided into other local schools until Jana is reopened.

Schools
The district contains 20 elementary schools, 6 middle schools, and 3 high schools.
Elementary Schools

Middle Schools

High Schools

References

External links
 Hazelwood School District
 HSD District Map
 Statistical data about the Hazelwood School District from the Missouri Dept. of Elementary and Secondary Education

School districts in Missouri
Education in St. Louis County, Missouri